Matthias Greitter, also Matthäus Greiter, (ca. 1495 – 20 December 1550) was a German priest, cantor and composer.

Life
Greitter was born in Aichach.  He became priest and cantor at Strasbourg Cathedral. In 1524 he joined the new Reformed Church. In 1538 he accepted a position of music teacher at the Collegium Argentinense (later University of Strasbourg).  In 1549 he moved back to the Catholic religion and founded a Catholic school of singing, but he died the following year in Strasbourg, presumably from the plague.

Works

Sacred works
 Domine non secundum, motet, 2 parts, 1545
 Passibus ambiguis/Fortuna desperata, motet, 4 parts 
 Christ ist erstanden/Christus surrexit, motet, 5 parts
 7 psalms
 Kyrie 
 Gloria 
 Credo 
 Alleluia

Secular works
 16 songs, 4–5 parts

References

Sources
 
 
 Hans-Christian Mueller and Sarah Davies's article in New Grove Dictionary of Music

External links
 
Free scores at the Mutopia Project

1490s births
1550 deaths
Year of birth uncertain
People from Aichach
Clergy from Strasbourg
16th-century German composers
Musicians from Strasbourg